Paratalanta stachialis is a moth in the family Crambidae. It was described by Sergiusz Graf von Toll and Roman Wojtusiak in 1957. It is found in Jilin, China.

References

Moths described in 1957
Pyraustinae